Unidare Rugby Football Club, commonly known as Unidare RFC, is a Rugby union club founded in 1958. Unidare currently play at Balcurris park, Ballymun in Dublin city, Ireland. The club's emblem is a Raven and they play in Black and Red. The club plays in the Junior (J4) section of the Leinster Branch Metropolitan League.

History

Foundation

Unidare Rugby Football Club was founded in 1958 by workers of the Unidare Works in Finglas, which is now defunct. During the foundation years (1958–1977) the club participated in the Business Houses Cup Competition and took part in friendly matches during the rest of the season. The club did not have their own grounds, but were given the use of a playing field and dressing rooms in Blackrock College by Father Shields.

Business Houses League

In 1977 the Business Houses League was formed. At that time Unidare Rugby Football Club was given grounds in Unidare Industrial estate on Jamestown Road, Finglas. The grounds were developed further by the club with dressing rooms, training lights, etc. The club did well in the Business Houses League, winning it for the first time in the 1980-1981 season. AIB had won the competition for the first three seasons of the competition. The club continued to participate in this competition during the 1980s.

Recent developments

In 1990 the club lost its playing fields when Unidare plc sold the land for development, and the club was hosted by Suttonians RFC and Malahide RFC for different seasons. In 2005, the club formed an alliance with Dublin City University Sports to play and train in the Ballymun grounds. As of 2011, Unidare played 21 seasons without a permanent home. Unidare in conjunction with The Dublin City Council were allocated the use of Balcurris Park as their new home ground.

Youth Section

In recent years, the club has undergone a revival in interest and membership and has focused in particular on the development of its youth teams. In the 2007/08 season, the club's first competitive under-age side created history by coming runners-up in the Dublin Metro U-18 League, at their very first attempt.  The club currently fields youth sides at U-14, U-16, & U-18 and has ten fully qualified coaches currently working in their underage section.

2007/2008 Season

2007/2008 J4 Metropolitan League Fixtures/Results

2007/2008 Friendly Fixtures/Results

2011/2012 Season

2011/2012 J4 Metropolitan League Fixtures/Results

See also
 Leinster Branch

References

Sport at Dublin City University
Rugby clubs established in 1958
Rugby union clubs in Dublin (city)